Mark Thomas (born 1963) is British comedian and political activist.

Mark Thomas may also refer to:

Mark Thomas (MP), English politician who sat in the House of Commons in 1659
Mark G. Thomas (born 1964), British evolutionary geneticist
Mark Thomas (newspaper editor) (born 1967), former editor of The People
Mark Thomas (defensive end) (born 1969), American football defensive end
Mark Thomas (tight end) (born 1976), American football tight end
Mark Thomas (cricketer) (born 1977), English cricketer
Mark Thomas (ice hockey) (born 1983), English ice hockey player
Mark Thomas (bank robber),  a member of the Aryan Republican Army, who robbed 22 Midwest US banks
Mark Thomas (flutist), American flutist
Mark Thomas (rugby league), Australian rugby league footballer
Mark Thomas (weightlifter) (born 1963), British weightlifter

See also
Marc Thomas (disambiguation)

Marcus Thomas (disambiguation)